The Generalitat de Catalunya, or the Government of Catalonia, is the institutional system by which Catalonia politically organizes its self-government as an autonomous community of Spain. It is formed by the Parliament of Catalonia, the Presidency of the Generalitat de Catalunya, and the Executive Council of Catalonia (also very often referred to as Govern, "Government").

Its origins are in the 13th century when permanent councils of deputies (deputations) were created to rule administration of the Courts of the different realms that formed the Crown of Aragon which gave birth to the Deputation of the General of the Principality of Catalonia (1359), the Deputation of the General of the Kingdom of Aragon (1362) and the Deputation of the General of the Kingdom of Valencia (1412). The modern Generalitat was established in 1931, as the institution of self-government of Catalonia within the Spanish Republic. Remaining in exile after the end of the Civil War in 1939, it was reestablished in 1977.

Its headquarters are at the Palau de la Generalitat, in the city of Barcelona.

History

Catalonia's political past as a territorially differentiated community with its own representative and separated institutions, materialized in the institutional systems of the combined Catalan counties (9th-12th centuries), the Principality of Catalonia within the Crown of Aragon (1164-1714) and the Monarchy of Spain (1516-1714/1833), as well the establishment of Catalan self-government from 1931 onwards, can be divided into different stages, separated by ruptures in the legal/public order.

The Generalitat of Catalonia can trace its origins in the Catalan Courts, as during the reign of James I the Conqueror (1208-1276) they reunited and were convoked by the king, as representatives of the social statements of the time. Under the reign of Peter the Great (1276-1285), the Catalan Courts gained institutional status, after the king obliged himself to celebrate an annual "General Court". The Catalan Courts exercised as Council and had legislative functions through its three branches (braços): the ecclesiastical (clergy), the military (nobility) and the popular (villages and towns submitted to direct rule of the king). This union of the tree branches was named "Lo General de Cathalunya", where "General" means the political community of the Catalans as a whole.

Is in 1289 when the first step into becoming an institution happens during the Courts celebrated in the castle of Montsó (located in the Kingdom of Aragon, ruled by Count of Barcelona, since the year 1151 AD when Count Ramon Berenguer IV married Princess Petronilla of Aragon). A commission was then designed as "Diputació del General" (Deputation of the General), as to temporarily collect the "services" or tributes that the "branches" granted the king on his demand. This tax was popularly known as "Drets Generals" (General Rights) or "generalitats" (generalities), finding its counterpart in the French "Généralités", which were also founded as taxing districts.

Medieval origins 

The Pau i Treva de Déu ("Peace and Truce of God") was a social movement born in the eleventh century promoted by the Church, united with the peasantry as the response to the violence perpetrated by feudal nobles. The hometowns, then, delimited a space protected of feudal violence. However, to ensure a coexistence climate, it was necessary to go further, establishing an authority that prohibited the practice of any type of violent act anywhere in the territory. This was the objective of the assemblies of Peace and Truce of God, the first of which, in the Catalan counties, took place in Toluges (Roussillon), in 1027, under the presidency of Abbot Oliba, on behalf of Bishop Berenguer d'Elna, absent from the diocese because he was on a pilgrimage. The origin of the Catalan Courts can be considered from the Peace of Truce of God.

The Generalitat of Catalonia stems from the medieval institution which ruled, in the name of the King as Count of Barcelona, some aspects of the administration of the Principality of Catalonia. The Catalan Courts were the main institution of the Principality during its existence as a polity and approved the Catalan constitutions. The first constitutions were that of the Courts of 1283.

The Medieval precedent of the Generalitat, the Diputació del General de Catalunya ("Deputation of the General of Catalonia") was a permanent council of deputies established by the Courts in order to recapt the new "tax of the General" in 1359, and gained an important political power during the next centuries, assuming tasks of prosecutor. It was chosen by the legislators in 1931 because they felt it was appropriate for invoking as a legitimising base for contemporary self-government.

First abolition
Catalan institutions which depended on the Generalitat were abolished in what is currently known in Catalonia as Northern Catalonia, one year after the signature of the Treaty of the Pyrenees in the 17th century, which transferred the territory from Spanish to French sovereignty.

Then, by the early 18th century, as the "Nueva Planta Decrees" were passed in Spain after the Catalan defeat in the War of the Spanish Succession, the institution, as well as the other political institutions of the Principality, was abolished in the Spanish territory as well.

First restoration

The Generalitat was restored in the Catalonia under Spanish administration in 1931 during the events of the proclamation of the Second Spanish Republic when Francesc Macià, leader of the Republican Left of Catalonia (ERC), declared the Catalan Republic within an Iberian Federation on 14 April but later reached an agreement with the Spanish ministers, in which the Catalan Republic was renamed Generalitat of Catalonia (Catalan: Generalitat de Catalunya) and given its modern political and representative function as the institution of self-government of Catalonia within the Spanish Republic. The restored Generalitat was ruled by a statute of autonomy approved by the Spanish Cortes in 1932 and included a parliament, a presidency, a government and a court of appeal. It was presided by Francesc Macià (1931-1933) and Lluís Companys (1933-1940). The governments of Macià and Companys enacted a progressive agenda, despite the internal difficulties, while fought to demand the complete transfer of the powers estipulated in the Statute.

After the right wing coalition won the Spanish elections in 1933, the leftist leaders of the Generalitat of Catalonia rebelled in October of 1934 against the Spanish authorities, and it was temporarily suspended from 1934 to 1936. After the victory of the left in the Spanish elections of February 1936 the new Spanish government pardoned the Catalan government and the self-government was fully restored.

Throughout the Spanish Civil War (1936-1939) the Generalitat remained loyal to the Republic, assuming powers in areas belonging to the State in Catalonia, such as border controls, coinage, justice and defense. However, due to the revolutionary situation created after the coup d'etat, the Generalitat lost most of the effective power over the territory, largely controlled by local committees under the command of the Central Committee of Antifascist Militias of Catalonia. As the weeks passed, the Catalan government progressively recovered somewhat control until May 1937.

Second abolition
In 1939, as the Spanish Civil War finished with the defeat of the Republican side, the Generalitat of Catalonia as an institution was abolished and remained so during the Francoist dictatorship until 1975. The president of the Generalitat at the time, Lluís Companys, was tortured and executed on 15 October 1940 for the crime of 'military rebellion'. Nonetheless, the Generalitat maintained its official existence in exile, led by presidents Josep Irla (1940-1954) and Josep Tarradellas (1954-1980).

Second restoration
The succession of presidents of the Generalitat was maintained in exile from 1939 to 1977, when Josep Tarradellas returned to Catalonia and was recognized as the legitimate president by the Spanish government. Tarradellas, when he returned to Catalonia, made his often quoted remark  "Ciutadans de Catalunya: ja sóc aquí" ("Citizens of Catalonia: I am back!"), reassuming the autonomous powers of Catalonia, one of the historic nationalities of present-day Spain.

After this, the powers given to the autonomous Catalan government according to the Spanish Constitution of 1978 were transferred and the Statute of Autonomy of Catalonia (Estatut d'Autonomia) was passed after being approved both by referendum in Catalonia and by the Spanish parliament.

Recent history

Governance since 2006 
José Montilla, leader of the Catalan Socialist Party, had been the president of the Generalitat until November 2010, he was backed up by a tripartite coalition of left-wing and Catalan nationalist political parties. His party actually won fewer seats in parliament than the main opposition party, Convergence and Union, in the 2006 election, but as he gathered more support from MPs from other parties in the parliament, he was able to repeat the same coalition government that his predecessor (Pasqual Maragall) had formed in order to send CiU to the opposition for the first time after 23 years of Jordi Pujol's government.

On 18 June 2006, a reformed version was approved of the Statute of Autonomy of Catalonia and went into effect in August. In its inception, the reform was promoted by both the leftist parties in the government and by the main opposition party (CiU), which were united in pushing for increased devolution of powers from the Spanish government level, enhanced fiscal autonomy and finances, and explicit recognition of Catalonia's national identity; however the details of its final redaction were harshly fought and the subject became a controversial issue in the Catalan politics, with ERC, themselves members of the Tripartite, finally opposing it.
In 2010, the Spanish Constitutional Court reduced the Statute voted in a referendum, eliminating or reinterpreting more than 200 articles, due to a signature collection promoted by then the Spanish opposition leader, Mariano Rajoy. This event is considered one of the main reasons for the independence boom that happened from 2010 with 8% support to 2018 with 52.4%  of support.

Artur Mas held the office of President of the Generalitat from December 2010 until his resignation in January 2016, leading a minority government dependent on pacts with other parties including the Socialists' Party of Catalonia following the 2010 election and the 2015 election.

Former president Artur Mas was recently charged by the Spanish government for civil disobedience, after he organised and staged a referendum on independence in 2014.

Current status 
In 2016, Carles Puigdemont, member of the Catalan European Democratic Party, successor formation to the defunct Convergence and Union alliance. was elected President of the Generalitat of Catalonia.   He was suspended from office on 27 October 2017, by the Spanish government.

After a number of attempts to invest a new president, Quim Torra became president on 17 May 2018, with Together for Catalonia and Republican Left of Catalonia votes in favor.

On 22 May 2021, Pere Aragonès from the Republican Left of Catalonia was elected the 132nd president of the Generalitat.

Autonomous system of government

The autonomous government consists of the Executive Council, the President and the Parliament. Some people wrongly apply this name only to the executive council (the cabinet of the autonomous government); however, Generalitat de Catalunya is the system of Catalan autonomous government as a whole.

The region has gradually achieved a greater degree of autonomy since 1979. After Navarre and the Basque Country regions, Catalonia has the greatest level of self-government in Spain. When it is fully instated, the Generalitat holds exclusive and wide jurisdiction in various matters of culture, environment, communications, transportation, commerce, public safety and local governments. In many aspects relating to education, health and justice, the region shares jurisdiction with the Spanish government.

One of the examples of Catalonia's degree of autonomy is its own police force, the Mossos d'Esquadra ("Auxiliary Force"), which has taken over most of the police functions in Catalonia which used to be served by the Civil Guard (Guardia Civil) and the Spanish National Police Corps.

With few exceptions, most of the justice system is administered by national judicial institutions. The legal system is uniform throughout the Spanish state, with the exception of some parts of civil law – especially family, inheritance, and real estate law – that have traditionally been ruled by so-called foral law. The fields of civil law that are subject to autonomous legislation have been codified in the Civil Code of Catalonia (Codi civil de Catalunya) consisting of six books that have successively entered into force since 2003.

Another institution stemming from the Catalan autonomy statute, but independent from the Generalitat in its check and balance functions, is the Síndic de Greuges (ombudsman) to address problems that may arise between private citizens or organizations and the Generalitat or local governments.

Legislature 

The Parliament of Catalonia is the unicameral legislative body of the Generalitat and represents the people of Catalonia. Its 135members (diputats) are elected by universal suffrage to serve for a four-year period. According to the Statute of Autonomy, it has powers to legislate over devolved matters such as education, health, culture, internal institutional and territorial organization, nomination of the President of the Generalitat and control the Government, budget and other affairs. The last Catalan election was held on 14 February 2021, and its current speaker (president) is Laura Borràs, incumbent since 12 March 2021.

Presidency 
The President of the Generalitat of Catalonia is the highest representative of Catalonia, and is also responsible of leading the government's action, presiding the Executive Council. Since the restoration of the Generalitat on the return of democracy in Spain, the Presidents of Catalonia have been Josep Tarradellas (1977–1980, president in exile since 1954), Jordi Pujol (1980–2003), Pasqual Maragall (2003–2006), José Montilla (2006–2010), Artur Mas (2010–2016), Carles Puigdemont (2016–2017) and, after the imposition of direct rule from Madrid, Quim Torra (2018–2020) and Pere Aragonès (2020–).

Executive 

The Executive Council or Government, is the body responsible of the government of the Generalitat, it holds executive and regulatory power, being accountable to the Catalan Parliament. It comprises the President of the Generalitat, the First Minister or the Vice President, and the ministers appointed by the president. Its seat is the Palau de la Generalitat, Barcelona. The current government is formed by the center-left pro-independence Republican Left of Catalonia (ERC) after a political crisis in which the center-right member of th coalition Together for Catalonia (Junts) abandoned in 2022 its ministerial seats. It is made up of 14 ministers, alongside to the President and a secretary of government.

International presence
As an autonomous community of Spain, Catalonia is not recognized as a sovereign state by any sovereign state. However, as Catalonia has progressively gained a greater degree of self-government in recent years, the Catalan Government has established nearly bilateral relationships with foreign bodies. For the most part, these relationships are with the governments of other powerful subnational entities such as Quebec or California. In addition, like most Spanish autonomous communities, Catalonia has permanent delegations before international organizations, such as the European Union.

More recently, Catalonia has embarked upon an expansion process of its international representation by opening a number of delegations worldwide. As of 2017, these exceeded 40. Most of these offices are located in major world cities like London, New York City, Los Angeles, Paris, Tokyo and others. Each office has specific duties assigned by their ministry or department agency. Generally, the functions of these are the representation of specific interests of the Government of Catalonia, trade and foreign investment, Catalan culture and language support, tourist promotion, and international cooperation activities.

There are no specific Catalan political institutions in Northern Catalonia, other than the French département of Pyrénées-Orientales. However, since 5 September 2003, there has been a Casa de la Generalitat in Perpignan, which aims to promote the Catalan culture and facilitate exchanges between each side of the Franco–Spanish border.

Under application of article 155 of the Constitution following the constitutional crisis of 2017 Catalonia only had 1 delegation abroad, after the rest were closed, this delegation was the one of Brussels, Belgium. The Catalan Government elected after 21 December election is in process to restore the closed delegations.

This is the list of the current delegations of the Government of Catalonia abroad:

  Brussels, Belgium (delegation before the  European Union)
  Buenos Aires, Argentina
  Vienna, Austria
  Zagreb, Croatia
  Paris, France
  Berlin, Germany
  Rome, Italy
  Riga, Latvia
  Mexico, D.F., Mexico
  Lisbon, Portugal
  Stockholm, Sweden
  Geneva, Switzerland
  Tunis, Tunisia
  London, United Kingdom
  Washington, D.C., United States

See also
 Politics of Catalonia
 2017–18 Spanish constitutional crisis
 Catalonia Government 2021-2025 term of office
 Commonwealth of Catalonia
 List of presidents of the Government of Catalonia

Notes

References
 Party Urging More Autonomy From Spain Seems to Win in Catalonia Article on New York Times, 2 November 2006
 Courage in Catalonia Article on New York Times, 22 June 2006
 Voters in Catalonia Approve A Plan for Greater Autonomy Article on New York Times, 19 June 2006
 Spain Moves On Law to Give Broad Powers To Catalonia Article on New York Times, 31 March 2006

External links

 

 
History of Catalonia